Erick Olim Mendonça (born 21 July 1995) is a Mexican-born Portuguese futsal player who plays for Sporting CP and the Portugal national team. Erick was diagnosed with Legg–Calvé–Perthes disease when he was 7 years old and was told it would be very unlikely for him to be able to play futsal again, but after spending the following seven years battling the disease, including time spent in a wheelchair, he made a recovery and returned to futsal.

Honours
UEFA Futsal Champions League: 2018–19

International
Portugal
FIFA Futsal World Cup: 2021
UEFA Futsal Championship: 2022
 Futsal Finalissima: 2022

References

External links
Sporting CP profile 

1995 births
Living people
Futsal defenders
Portuguese men's futsal players
Mexican men's futsal players
Sporting CP futsal players
Sportspeople from Guadalajara, Jalisco